Taham (also known as Tagam) is a village in Taham Rural District of the Central District of Zanjan County, Zanjan province, Iran. At the 2006 National Census, its population was 1,075 in 279 households. The following census in 2011 counted 1,214 people in 318 households. The latest census in 2016 showed a population of 1,073 people in 348 households; it was the largest village in its rural district.

References 

Zanjan County

Populated places in Zanjan Province

Populated places in Zanjan County